United Nations Security Council resolutions are United Nations resolutions adopted by the fifteen members of the Security Council (UNSC); the United Nations (UN) body charged with "primary responsibility for the maintenance of international peace and security".

Resolutions by number 

All resolutions are included in these chronological lists.

 1 to 100 (25 January 1946 – 27 October 1953)
 101 to 200 (24 November 1953 – 15 March 1965)
 201 to 300 (19 March 1965 – 12 October 1971)
 301 to 400 (20 October 1971 – 7 December 1976)
 401 to 500 (14 December 1976 – 28 January 1982)
 501 to 600 (25 February 1982 – 19 October 1987)
 601 to 700 (30 October 1987 – 17 June 1991)
 701 to 800 (31 July 1991 – 8 January 1993)
 801 to 900 (8 January 1993 – 4 March 1994)
 901 to 1000 (4 March 1994 – 23 June 1995)
 1001 to 1100 (30 June 1995 – 27 March 1997)
 1101 to 1200 (28 March 1997 – 30 September 1998)
 1201 to 1300 (15 October 1998 – 31 May 2000)
 1301 to 1400 (31 May 2000 – 28 March 2002)
 1401 to 1500 (28 March 2002 – 14 August 2003)
 1501 to 1600 (26 August 2003 – 4 May 2005)
 1601 to 1700 (31 May 2005 – 10 August 2006)
 1701 to 1800 (11 August 2006 – 20 February 2008)
 1801 to 1900 (20 February 2008 – 16 December 2009)
 1901 to 2000 (16 December 2009 – 27 July 2011)
 2001 to 2100 (28 July 2011 – 25 April 2013)
 2101 to 2200 (25 April 2013 – 12 February 2015)
 2201 to 2300 (15 February 2015 – 26 July 2016)
 2301 to 2400 (26 July 2016 – 8 February 2018)
 2401 to 2500 (24 February 2018 – 4 December 2019)
 2501 to 2600 (16 December 2019 – 15 October 2021)
 2601 to 2700 (29 October 2021 – present)

Resolutions by year 
These links go directly to a year (or the bottom of the page) in one of the lists in the Resolutions by number section. Some years continue in the next list.

 1946
 1947
 1948
 1949
 1950
 1951
 1952
 1953
 1954
 1955
 1956
 1957
 1958
 1959
 1960
 1961
 1962
 1963
 1964
 1965
 1966
 1967
 1968
 1969
 1970
 1971
 1972
 1973
 1974
 1975
 1976
 1977
 1978
 1979
 1980
 1981
 1982
 1983
 1984
 1985
 1986
 1987
 1988
 1989
 1990
 1991
 1992
 1993
 1994
 1995
 1996
 1997
 1998
 1999
 2000
 2001
 2002
 2003
 2004
 2005
 2006
 2007
 2008
 2009
 2010
 2011
 2012
 2013
 2014
 2015
 2016
 2017
 2018
 2019
 2020
 2021
 2022
 2023

Resolutions by topic 

These are lists of resolutions about the same topic. There are more topics in :Category:United Nations Security Council resolutions by topic but it only shows a link to resolutions with their own article.  that is nearly all resolutions until 2013 but few since then.

 Cyprus
 Iran
 Iraq
 Israel
 Lebanon
 Nagorno-Karabakh conflict
 North Korea
 Palestine
 Syria
 Western Sahara
 Yemen
 Conflicts in former Yugoslavia

Vetoed resolutions 
Vetoed resolutions are not adopted so they are not included in the earlier lists.
 List of vetoed resolutions
 Vetoed resolutions on Syria
 Draft resolution on Israeli settlements, 2011

References